Jamesia is a genus of longhorn beetles of the subfamily Lamiinae, containing the following species:

 Jamesia bella Galileo & Martins, 2003
 Jamesia duofasciata Dillon & Dillon, 1952
 Jamesia ericksoni Hovore, 1989
 Jamesia fuscofasciata Dillon & Dillon, 1952
 Jamesia globifera (Fabricius, 1801)
 Jamesia lineata Fisher, 1926
 Jamesia multivittata Bates, 1869
 Jamesia papulenta Thomson, 1868
 Jamesia phileta Dillon & Dillon, 1945 
 Jamesia pyropina Dillon & Dillon, 1945
 Jamesia ramirezi Nearns & Tavakilian, 2012

References

Onciderini